Lawrence Joseph McGuinness (24 June 1920 – 27 December 2017) was a Canadian equestrian. He competed in two events at the 1952 Summer Olympics.

References

1920 births
2017 deaths
Canadian male equestrians
Olympic equestrians of Canada
Equestrians at the 1952 Summer Olympics
Anglophone Quebec people
Sportspeople from Montreal